Saint-Quentin-de-Chalais (literally Saint-Quentin of Chalais) is a commune in the Charente department in southwestern France, located  southeast of Chalais and  south of Angoulême in the Nouvelle-Aquitaine region.

Population

Notable residents
Pierre Papillaud, French billionaire businessman.

See also
Communes of the Charente department

References

Communes of Charente
Charente communes articles needing translation from French Wikipedia